Trinidad and Tobago competed at the 2011 World Championships in Athletics from August 27 to September 4 in Daegu, South Korea.

Team selection
A team of 20 athletes was announced to represent the country in the event. The team was to be led by the sprinters Richard "Torpedo" Thompson and Kelly-Ann Baptiste. The final team on the entry list comprised 19 athletes.
The following athletes appeared on the preliminary entry list, but not on the official start list of the specific event: resulting in a total number of 16 competitors:

Medalists
The following competitor from Trinidad and Tobago won a medal at the Championships

Results

Men

Women

References

External links
Official local organising committee website
Official IAAF competition website

Nations at the 2011 World Championships in Athletics
World Championships in Athletics
Trinidad and Tobago at the World Championships in Athletics